1999 Uganda Cup was the 25th season of the main Ugandan football Cup.

Overview
The competition was known as the Kakungulu Cup and was won by Dairy Heroes FC who defeated Lyantonde FC 3-0 on penalties in the final. The score was level at 0-0 at the end of extra time.  The results are not available for the earlier rounds but it is known that Dairy Heroes eliminated SC Villa in the semi-finals.

Final

Footnotes

External links
 Uganda - List of Cup Finals - RSSSF (Mikael Jönsson, Ian King and Hans Schöggl)

Ugandan Cup
Uganda Cup
Cup